The Claw is a 1918 American silent drama film directed by Robert G. Vignola and starring Clara Kimball Young, Milton Sills, and Jack Holt.

Cast
 Clara Kimball Young as Mary Saurin 
 Milton Sills as Major Anthony Kinsella 
 Henry Woodward as Richard Saurin 
 Mary Mersch as Judy Saurin 
 Jack Holt as Maurice Stair 
 Edward Kimball as Postmaster 
 Marcia Manon as Mrs. Valetta

References

Bibliography
 Donald W. McCaffrey & Christopher P. Jacobs. Guide to the Silent Years of American Cinema. Greenwood Publishing, 1999.

External links

 

1918 films
1918 drama films
1910s English-language films
American silent feature films
Silent American drama films
American black-and-white films
Films directed by Robert G. Vignola
Selznick Pictures films
1910s American films